Mishicot High School is a public high school located in Mishicot, Wisconsin.

Athletics 
Mishicot's athletic teams are known as the Indians, and compete in the Big East Conference.

Enrollment 
From 2000 to 2019, high school enrollment declined 32.6%.

Enrollment at Mishicot High School, 2000–2019

Notable alumni 

 Brendan Dassey, convicted murderer and subject of Making a Murderer
 Julie Wojta, basketball player

References

External links
Mishicot High School website

Public high schools in Wisconsin
Schools in Manitowoc County, Wisconsin